John Shaw Neilson was an Australian poet. Slightly built, for most of his life he worked as a labourer, fruit-picking, clearing scrub, navvying and working in quarries, and, after 1928, working as a messenger with the Country Roads Board in Melbourne. Largely untrained and only basically educated, Neilson became known as one of Australia's finest lyric poets, who wrote a great deal about the natural world, and the beauty in it.

Early life
Neilson was born in Penola, South Australia of purely Scottish ancestry. His grandparents were John Neilson and Jessie MacFarlane of Cupar, Neil Mackinnon of Skye, and Margaret Stuart of Greenock. His mother, Margaret MacKinnon, was born at Dartmoor, Victoria, his father, John Neilson, at Stranraer, Scotland, in 1844.

John Neilson senior was brought to South Australia at nine years of age, had practically no education, and was a shepherd, shearer and small farmer all his life. He never had enough money to get good land, and like other pioneers he fought drought and rabbits and other pests, receiving little reward for his labours. He died in 1922, having lived just long enough to see his son accepted as an Australian poet. He himself had written verses; one song, Waiting for the Rain, was popular in the shearing sheds, and in January 1893 he wrote the senior prize poem, The Pioneers, for the literary competition held by the Australian Natives' Association. In 1938 a small collection of his poems, The Men of the Fifties, was published by the Hawthorn Press at Melbourne.

John Shaw Neilson had little more education than his father. When about eight years old he was for 15 months at the state school at Penola, but he had to leave in 1881 when the family removed to Minimay in the south-west Wimmera in Victoria. There was no school at Minimay then, but four years later one was opened and Neilson attended for another 15 months. There was, however, a Bible and a tattered copy of Robert Burns' poems in the house, and when at the age of 15 a copy of Thomas Hood's poems came in his way, Neilson read them all with great joy. Driven out by drought, Neilson's father took his family to Nhill in 1889, and was employed as a farm worker and on the roads. His son soon after began to write verses of which some appeared in the local press and one in The Australasian in Melbourne.

Poetry
In January 1893 John Shaw Neilson won the junior prize for a poem at the Australian Natives' Association's competition, in the same year that his father won the senior prize. In 1895 he went with his father to Sea Lake, and about a year later had some verses accepted by The Bulletin in Sydney. But his health broke down and he did little writing for about four years.

He was contributing to the Bulletin between 1901 and 1906, and about 1908 some of his verses, mostly of a light or popular kind, were accepted by Randolph Bedford for the Clarion. From about 1906 Neilson's sight began to fail, for the rest of his life he was able to do little reading, and most of his work was dictated.

When The Bookfellow was revived in 1911 Neilson was a contributor, and Alfred George Stephens the editor, began collecting the best of his poems, intending to issue them in a volume under the title of Green Days and Cherries; Fred John's Annual for 1913 included Neilson as the author of this volume. It was, however, delayed; World War I delayed it further; and it was not issued until 1919, when the title Heart of Spring was adopted. It had a laudatory preface by Stephens which stated that some of the work was "unsurpassed in the range of English lyrics". It was well received, and in 1923, with the help of Mrs Louise Dyer, another volume, Ballad and Lyrical Poems, was published. This included nearly all the work in the first volume with some 20 additional lyrics.

About this time Neilson visited Melbourne and met many of the literary people of the period. Now in his 50s and not a robust man he was beginning to feel the strain of physical work.

"I don't mind some kinds of pick and shovel work," he said to Percival Serle, "but when I have to throw heavy stuff over my shoulder it gives me rather a wrench." He may have been referring to the time he spent in the Heyfield area, where he wrote several poems and helped in the construction of the Lake Glenmaggie weir wall.

In 1925 and again in 1926, Alfred Stephens suggested in newspaper articles that more suitable employment should be found for him. The difficulty was that Neilson's poor eyesight unfitted him for most kinds of work. However, a movement began in Melbourne to help him and he was granted a small literary pension; and eventually in 1928 a position was found for him as an attendant in the office of the Victorian Country Roads Board. This office was directly opposite the Exhibition Gardens, Melbourne, and in these pleasant surroundings Neilson spent his days until near the end of his life.

A volume, New Poems, was published in 1927, and in 1934 his Collected Poems appeared. Four years later another small volume was published, Beauty Imposes. A number of Neilson's poems were set to music by composers such as Margaret Sutherland, Alfred Hill, Cathie O'Sullivan, Llew and Mara Kiek, Richard Keam and Darryl Emmerson. The latter's play, The Pathfinder, based on the life and writings of Neilson, enjoyed much success in the 1980s, toured twice, was produced for radio by the Australian Broadcasting Commission, and published by Currency Press, Sydney, in 1987. In 2012 an updated and expanded compilation of Neilson's Collected Poems, edited by Margaret Roberts, was published by University of Western Australia Press.

Death
Neilson retired from the Country Roads Board early in 1941, and went to Queensland to stay with friends. His literary pension was now increased to £2 a week. Soon after his return to Melbourne his health began to fail, and he died of heart disease at a private hospital on 12 May 1942. He was buried in the Footscray Cemetery near Melbourne.

Legacy
In 1946 a bronze sculpture of the poet was commissioned for the opening of the Footscray Children's Library in Buckley Street. The sculpture, by Wallace Anderson, is still on display at the Footscray Library in Paisley Street. The Maribyrnong Library Service, who now run the Footscray Library, holds an archive, the John Shaw Neilson Collection. There is also a local John Shaw Neilson Society.

In 1964 the Nhill and District Historical Society erected a monument to Neilson. In 1972 the cottage birthplace of Neilson was relocated from Penola to a park in Nhill, as the John Shaw Neilson National Memorial Cottage.

Since 1970 the Fellowship of Australian Writers has presented an annual award, the FAW John Shaw Neilson Poetry Award, for unpublished poems of at least 14 lines.

Since 2005 the Penola Coonawarra Arts Festival have hosted the John Shaw Neilson Art Prize, for visual works inspired by the poet.

Despite Melbourne's strong literary tradition, there are no Melbourne suburbs named after writers.  There was a campaign in 2009 to name a new suburb after Neilson.

Works

 Old Granny Sullivan (poems), Sydney, Bookfellow, 1915.
 Heart of Spring (poems), Sydney, Bookfellow, 1919.
 Ballad and Lyrical Poems, Sydney, Bookfellow, 1923.
 New Poems, Sydney, Bookfellow, 1927.
 Collected Poems of John Shaw Neilson, edited and with introduction by R. H. Croll, Melbourne, Lothian, 1934.
 Beauty Imposes: Some Recent Verse, Angus and Robertson, 1938.
 Unpublished Poems, edited by James Devaney, Angus and Robertson, 1947.
 Shaw Neilson: poetry selections, selected and introduced by Judith Wright, Angus and Robertson, 1963.
 The Poems of Shaw Neilson, edited and introduction by A. R. Chisholm, Angus and Robertson, 1965, revised edition, 1973.
 Witnesses of Spring, edited by Judith Wright and Val Vallis, Angus and Robertson, 1970.
 Selected Poems, edited by A. R. Chisholm, Angus and Robertson, 1976.
 Green Days and Cherries: The Early Verse of Shaw Neilson, edited by Hugh Anderson and Leslie James Blake, Red Rooster Press, 1981.
 Some Poems of John Shaw Neilson: Selected and With Wood-Engravings, Canberra, Brindabella Press, 1984.
 John Shaw Neilson: Poetry, Autobiography, and Correspondence, edited by Cliff Hanna, University of Queensland Press, 1991.
 Selected Poems, edited by Robert Gray, Angus and Robertson, 1991.
 The Sun Is Up: Selected Poems, Loch Haven Books, 1991.
 Collected Verse of John Shaw Neilson, edited by Margaret Roberts, University of Western Australia Publishing, 2012.
 Collected Poems of John Shaw Neilson, edited by Robert Dixon, Sydney University Press, 2013

Biographies
 John Shaw Neilson: a memorial, J. Roy Stevens, Bread and Cheese Club, 1942
 Shaw Neilson, James Devaney, Angus and Robertson, 1944
 Shaw Neilson, H.J. Oliver, Oxford University Press, 1968
 John Shaw Neilson, Hugh Anderson and L.J. Blake, Rigby, 1972
 
 The Pathfinder, Darryl Emmerson, Currency Press, 1987
 Poet of the Colours: The Life of John Shaw Neilson, John H. Phillips, Allen and Unwin, 1988
 The Folly of Spring: A Study of John Shaw Neilson's Poetry, Cliff Hanna, University of Queensland Press, 1990
 John Shaw Neilson: Poetry, Autobiography and Correspondence, edited by Cliff Hanna, University of Queensland Press, 1991
 Jock: A Life Story of John Shaw Neilson, Cliff Hanna, University of Queensland Press, 1999
 John Shaw Neilson: A Life in Letters, Helen Hewson, Melbourne University Press, 2001

References

External links
   at Sydney University
 
 Hugh Anderson, 'Neilson, John Shaw (1872 - 1942)', Australian Dictionary of Biography, Volume 10, Melbourne University Press, 1986, pp 673–674.
 Serle, Percival (1949). "Neilson, John Shaw". Dictionary of Australian Biography. Sydney: Angus and Robertson

1872 births
1942 deaths
Australian Presbyterians
Writers from South Australia
Australian people of Scottish descent
19th-century Australian writers
19th-century poets
20th-century Australian poets
Australian male poets
19th-century male writers
20th-century Australian male writers